Pili (Traditional Chinese: 霹靂, Pe̍h-oē-jī:  Phek-le̍k, "Thunderbolt") is a glove puppetry show from Taiwan. It is made by Pili International Multimedia. The TV series debuted in 1984 and once reached over 90% viewership. Unlike traditional puppet shows, Pili uses computer generated imagery (CGI) during action sequences. The delicate design of the appearance and characteristics of each puppet has made Pili a well-known TV series in Taiwan.

In 2000, the spin-off film Legend of the Sacred Stone was released. It was released on VHS and DVD in Taiwan and Japan (the Japanese edit significantly shortened). The Japanese release includes some unintentionally funny English subtitles, while the Taiwanese release has no English, so the only imports and bootlegs of the film generally found in North America have been of the Japanese version.

In February 2006, the American company Animation Collective, known for Kappa Mikey and Speed Racer: The Next Generation created an edited version of Pili on Cartoon Network titled Wulin Warriors. Many fans of the original series complained about the poor quality of the scripts and changes made for the American version. One example was the character Ye Hsiao-Chai (Scar in Wulin Warriors), who is a mute in the Taiwanese version of the series, but in the American version he speaks frequently. Many Cartoon Network viewers were hostile to Wulin Warriors because the programming of the series was part of a shift in the channel's focus to include live action programs. Although Cartoon Network stopped airing Wulin Warriors after only two episodes, all thirteen episodes could be seen on Kids' AOL, but were taken off after a few years and can now only be found on YouTube.

In 2016, Nitroplus, Good Smile Company, and Pili International Multimedia launched a website to announce Thunderbolt Fantasy, which premiered the summer of 2016. Thunderbolt Fantasy is a spinoff of the main Pili series, set in a similar wuxia setting with new characters. The show features slight differences from Pili's usual production approach, including half hour long episodes and anime-inspired character designs. Thunderbolt Fantasy is standalone from the main Pili series, with the exception of minor character cameos.

Pili International Multimedia currently runs their own Twitch account where they occasionally stream Pili.

From 2016-2021, Pili collaborated with Gen Urobuchi, producing three seasons of Thunderbolt Fantasy, a show with anime-style writing presented in the form of puppetry. 

Pili Fantasy: War of Dragons, a remake of Pili'''s 6th season, premiered on Netflix on July 12, 2019. This makes War of Dragons'' the first installment of the main Pili series to air in English speaking countries in an uncut format.

See also
Huang Hai-tai

References

External links
 Pili International Multimedia - English language web site of the series' creators
 Taipei Times - Pili mourns loss of valuable puppets to fire, October 2010
 Epilinet on Twitch - Pili being aired 24/7 on Pili International Multimedia's Twitch stream

Taiwanese wuxia television series
Taiwanese television shows featuring puppetry
Glove puppetry
1985 Taiwanese television series debuts